This page covers environmental issues in Greece.

Acid rain

Acid rain in Greece, causes big damages in archeological monuments.

Current policies
Greece is a signatory member of the Kyoto Protocol but there has been much sharp criticism from the failure to meet their intended targets for cutting carbon emissions. Many have claimed that policies have not been tough enough and the protocol has not been implemented in full owing to large business interests, though the government denies this. The government has also attracted sharp criticism about its waste management plans, as has the Mayor of Athens, though there are plans for new plants to be built to deal with the city's waste surplus. However, spatial planning that is being promoted for the protection of resources from exhaustion, destruction and pollution is part of a wider government plan addressing environmental issues. Many environmental issues in Greece are being solved with the help of the government. 

The Athens Metro has also relieved some pressure in terms of car pollution in Athens and the planned Thessaloniki Metro will help the situation there too. The municipality of Athens has also announced a plan to deal with pollution in the city, though the exact details are as yet unknown.

See also
List of environmental issues

Further reading

References

Issues
Greece